Gavilán o Paloma (Hawk or Dove) is a 1985 Mexican drama film. The movie is titled after one of José José's greatest songs. It chronicles the rise of Mexican music icon José José from his humble beginnings in Mexico City to his international superstardom. Gavilán o Paloma is starred by José José, playing himself, co-starred by Christian Bach and the comedian Jorge Ortiz de Pinedo. Fifteen of José José's songs are on the soundtrack.

Plot 
José José was born in a Mexican family of talented musicians. His father was an alcoholic operatic tenor and his mother was a pianist. Growing up in the tough neighborhoods of Mexico City, José began his career as a singer in serenades, and later in a jazz trio. His father died and his career took off due to his enormous talent. José started a relationship with Anel (Bach), a beautiful young actress, but because of his alcoholism and infidelities, she leaves him. José marries Kiki Herrera (Gina Romand), a beautiful socialite twenty years older than he is. After several fights and irreconcilable differences, José leaves her. After suffering a terrible pneumonia that nearly ended his career, Anel returns to be by his side and he recovers. After a couple of years without success, José signed a contract with a major record label and returns to the pinnacle of success to stay there for the rest of his career.

Production notes and awards
 It was shot in Mexico City.
 The movie was not a big commercial success because its release coincided with the 1985 Mexico City earthquake.
 It received two nominations in the Ariel Awards in the category of "Best Supporting Actor" (Rojo Grau) and "Best Supporting Actress" (Gina Romand).

External links 
 

1985 films
1985 drama films
1980s Spanish-language films
Films set in Mexico
Films about alcoholism
Mexican drama films
1980s Mexican films